Blue Waters is a populated place in the parish of Christ Church, Barbados. It is a coastal area located on the south coast of Barbados. Rockley Beach is a beach located in Blue Waters.

Business
Some guesthouses and inns exist in Blue Waters, such as the Rockley Beach Hotel and Blue Waters Beach Hotel.

See also
 List of cities, towns and villages in Barbados

References

External links
 Blue Waters on Internet Tourist Database

Christ Church, Barbados
Populated coastal places in Barbados
Populated places in Barbados